Aivars Bogdanovs (born 27 February 1965) is a Latvian biathlete. He competed at the 1992 Winter Olympics and the 1994 Winter Olympics.

References

External links
 

1965 births
Living people
Latvian male biathletes
Olympic biathletes of Latvia
Biathletes at the 1992 Winter Olympics
Biathletes at the 1994 Winter Olympics
People from Cēsis